Sacramento Mountains may refer to:

Sacramento Mountains (California)
Sacramento Mountains (New Mexico)